Edmond Castel, real name Edmond Castellino, (26 March 1886, Alès – 1 November 1947, Neuilly-sur-Seine) was a French actor.

Filmography 
 1927: Parisian Pleasures a silent film by Joe Francis
 1930: Ce qu'on dit, ce qu'on pense - short film, anonymous 
 1931: A Father Without Knowing It by Robert Wyler
 1931: Amour et business by Robert Péguy - short film 
 1932: To the Polls, Citizens by Jean Hémard
 1932:  by Georges Lacombe
 1932: Mirages de Paris by Fedor Ozep
 1932: Bouillabaisse by Roger Lion - short film 
 1933: Au pays du soleil by Robert Péguy
 1933: Les Misérables by Raymond Bernard - film shot in three periods 
 1935: Arènes joyeuses by Karl Anton
 1935: Le Collier du grand duc / Le parapluie de Monsieur Bec by Robert Péguy 
 1935: Monsieur Prosper by Robert Péguy
 1936: Bach the Detective by René Pujol
 1936: Les Croquignolle by Robert Péguy 
 1937: The Lafarge Case by Pierre Chenal
 1937:  by Wladimir Strijewski
 1938: La Marseillaise by Jean Renoir
 1938: Adrienne Lecouvreur by Marcel L'Herbier as Folard
 1939: L'Esclave blanche by Marc Sorkin
 1939: Sérénade by Jean Boyer
 1940: Ils étaient cinq permissionnaires by Pierre Caron
 1941: Le soleil a toujours raison by Pierre Billon
 1942: Mariage d'amour by Henri Decoin
 1942: Simplet by Fernandel
 1943: Après l'orage by Pierre-Jean Ducis
 1946: Land Without Stars by Georges Lacombe

External links 
 Edmond Castel on data.bnf.fr
 

French male film actors
1886 births
People from Alès
1947 deaths
20th-century French male actors
French male silent film actors